Shevchenko (alternative spellings Schevchenko, Ševčenko, Shevcenko, Szewczenko, Chevchenko), a family name of Ukrainian origin. It is derived from the Ukrainian word shvets, "cobbler/shoemaker", and the suffix -enko, denoting descent. It is somewhat equivalent to occupational surnames: German Schumacher, English Shoemaker and Shoesmith, also Laster.

People

Shevchenko
 Alexander Shevchenko (disambiguation), multiple individuals
 Alexandra Shevchenko (born 1988), Ukrainian feminist
 Andrey Anatolyevich Shevchenko, Russian politician
 Andriy Shevchenko (born 1976), Ukrainian football player and manager
 Andriy Shevchenko (politician) (born 1976), Ukrainian journalist and politician
 Anna Shevchenko (born 1993), Kazakhstani cross-country skier
 Antonina Shevchenko (born 1984), Kyrgyzstani/Peruvian martial artist
 Arkady Shevchenko (1930–1998), Ukrainian Soviet diplomat and defector
 Artem Shevchenko (born 1977), Ukrainian TV journalist and manager
 Christine Shevchenko (born 1988), Ukrainian-American ballet dancer
 Daryna Shevchenko (journalist)
 Denys Shevchenko (born 2003), Ukrainian footballer
 Dmitriy Shevchenko (disambiguation), multiple individuals
 Igor Shevchenko (disambiguation), multiple individuals
 Ihor Shevchenko (born 1971), Ukrainian politician
 Inna Shevchenko (born 1990), Ukrainian feminist
 Irina Shevchenko (born 1975), Russian hurdler
 Kirill Shevchenko (born 2002), Ukrainian chess grandmaster
 Leonid Shevchenko (1932–2017), Russian footballer
 Lyudmyla Shevchenko (born 1970), Ukrainian team handball player
 Maksim Shevchenko (disambiguation), multiple individuals
 Mykyta Shevchenko (born 1993), Ukrainian football goalkeeper
 Oleksandr Shevchenko (disambiguation), multiple individuals
 Oleksiy Shevchenko (born 1992), Ukrainian footballer
 Olga Shevchenko (born 1979), Russian ski-orienteering competitor
 Serhiy Shevchenko (disambiguation), multiple individuals
 Sofia Shevchenko (born 2001), Russian ice dancer
 Taras Shevchenko (1814–1861), Ukrainian poet and artist
 Valentina Shevchenko (born 1988), Kyrgyzstani-Peruvian mixed martial artist
 Valentyna Shevchenko (disambiguation), multiple individuals
 Vasyl Shevchenko (1888–1964), Ukrainian bandurist
 Vitaliy Shevchenko (born 1951), Russian footballer
 Vitaly Shevchenko, BBC journalist
 Vladislav Shevchenko (born 1940), Russian astronomer
 Vyacheslav Shevchenko (born 1985), Ukrainian footballer
 Yegor Shevchenko (born 1978), Russian footballer
 Yelena Shevchenko (born 1971), Soviet artistic gymnast
 Yevhen Shevchenko (born 1987), Ukrainian footballer

Other forms
 Ihor Ševčenko (1922–2009), American philologist and historian
 Tanja Szewczenko (born 1977), German figure skater

See also
 
 Neko Case (originally Shevchenko)
 Shevchuk
 Shvets

Ukrainian-language surnames
Occupational surnames
Surnames of Ukrainian origin